The Sylvers II is the second album by the Los Angeles, California-based R&B group the Sylvers. Released in 1973, it was produced by Keg Johnson and Jerry Peters. It was their final album for Pride Records before being moved over to Pride's parent label MGM Records for the release of 1974's The Sylvers III.

On June 1, 2018, The Sylvers II was reissued on vinyl as well as issued on CD for the first time on Light in the Attic Records.

Track listing
 All songs written by Leon Sylvers III, except where noted.
"We Can Make It If We Try" – 2:40
"Through the Love in My Heart" – 3:18
"Handle It" – 2:40
"I'll Never Let You Go" – 4:30
"Cry of a Dreamer" – 4:36
"Stay Away from Me" – 3:43
"I Don't Need to Prove Myself" – 3:33
"Let It Be Me" (Gilbert Bécaud, Mann Curtis, Pierre Delanoë)  – 5:00
"Love Me, Love Me Not" – 3:49
"I Remember" – 3:20
"Yesterday" (John Lennon, Paul McCartney)  – 2:25

Charts

Album

Single

Personnel
 Keg Johnson - producer
 Jerry Peters - producer, string and horn arrangements, rhythm track arrangements
 Michael Viner - executive producer
 David Crawford - string and horn arrangements
 Harvey Mason - percussion arrangements
 Jim Shifflett - recording engineer, mixing
 Saul Saget - art direction
 Ron Rafanelli - photography, design

References

External links
 The Sylvers II at Discogs

1973 albums
The Sylvers albums
MGM Records albums
Albums produced by Jerry Peters